Leeroy Reed (born 6 August 1990)) is a Welsh television star and recording artist. He rose to fame in 2012 after appearing in the first episode of the MTV television series The Valleys. Reed has continued to feature in the programme for the rest of its duration. In 2013, Reed recorded and released a single entitled "Can't Get Enough". The single was released on 23 June 2013 through Transmission Recordings and entered the UK Singles Chart at number 37. The Australian version of "Can't Get Enough" features Australian recording artist Emily Williams.
In October 2017, Reed was exposed as a drug dealer and sent to prison for 22 months.

Discography

Singles

References

1991 births
Living people
Black British television personalities
Black British male rappers
Welsh people of Jamaican descent
Welsh male rappers